Jirauliya is a village in Ujhani block, Budaun Tehsil and Budaun district, Uttar Pradesh, India. The major cast of the village residents is Kurmi. The village is administrated by Gram Panchayat. Budaun railway station is 6 KM away from the village. Its Village code is 128471.

References

Villages in Budaun district